The 28th Metro Manila Film Festival was held in Manila, Philippines from December 25, 2002 to January 10, 2003.

Regal Films' Mano Po was the big winner in the 2002 Metro Manila Film Festival. The film receives a total of twelve awards including the major awards such as Best Picture, Best Actor for Eddie Garcia, Best Actress for Ara Mina, Best Supporting Actress for Kris Aquino, and Best Director for Joel Lamangan among others. The film is also the recipient of the Gatpuno Antonio J. Villegas Cultural Awards.

Entries
There are two batches of films in competition, the first batch was shown from December 25, while the second batch was shown on January 1, 2003.

Winners and nominees

Awards
Winners are listed first and highlighted in boldface.

Multiple awards

Ceremony information
During the "Gabi ng Parangal" held in PICC on December 27, there were some controversies:

Walking out of Dekada '70 cast
The cast of the film Dekada '70 walked out of the award ceremonies after Lualhati Bautista failed to win the Best Story and Best Screenplay awards. Even more controversial was the decision of the judges to name the first-timer Ara Mina the Best Actress for her role in Mano Po, beating multi-awarded Vilma Santos, who was in Dekada '70.

Inclusion of two films
The producers of the films Spirit Warriors: The Shortcut and Lastikman protested the non-inclusion of the two films as official entries, prompting the Metro Manila Film Festival committee to extend the annual event. Consequently, the committee extended the film screenings to seven days to accommodate two more films which did not make it to the entries.

Spirit Warriors: The Shortcut issues
Speaking of the films, Chito Rono, director of Second Best Picture Dekada '70, was curious as to why was Spirit Warriors: The Shortcut named the Third Best Picture award if the officials disqualify it as an official entry. In the same way, the production team of Ang Agimat: Anting-Anting ni Lolo was also appalled to the decision of the jurors to give the Best Visual Effects award to Spirit Warriors: The Shortcut if they only use "mono", beating their use of the more advanced "Dolby Digital System".

Box office gross
Final figures as of January 10, 2003.

References

External links

Metro Manila Film Festival
MMFF
MMFF